"Lizzie and the Rainman"  is a song written by Kenny O'Dell and Larry Henley. The song was first recorded in 1972 being that year a single release for its co-writer Kenny O'Dell and an album cut for respectively Bobby Goldsboro (California Wine) and the Hollies ("Romany", under the slightly different title "Lizzy and the Rain Man").

Background
"Lizzie and the Rainman" relates how a 
rainmaker visiting a drought-stricken Texas town woos a skeptical local woman named Lizzie Cooper. The idea for the song came from the film The Rainmaker whose heroine is named Lizzie Curry.

Tanya Tucker recording
In 1975, the song was recorded by American country music artist Tanya Tucker.  A narrative song as was typical for the first phase of Tucker's career.  She recorded her vocal for "Lizzie and the Rainman" in a 19 March 1975 session  in Los Angeles produced by Snuff Garrett; Tucker would recall: "the recording was so impersonal. I was used to recording live with all the musicians in the studio, and I just sang to the tracks on this one." Released as the lead single from the album Tanya Tucker - which marked Tucker's MCA Records debut - "Lizzie and the Rainman" was Tucker's fourth Hot Country Songs #1 and was also her first single to make the Pop Top 40, reaching #37 on the Billboard Hot 100 in June 1975. A #7 A/C hit, "Lizzie and the Rainman" would prove to be Tucker's only Top 40 hit despite her later recording material more specifically aimed at the Pop market; her one subsequent Hot 100 item "Here's Some Love" peaked at #82.

Chart performance

Other recordings
In 1973, Alex Taylor had a single release of the song.

References

Songs about weather
Songs about occupations
1975 singles
1972 songs
Bobby Goldsboro songs
Tanya Tucker songs
Songs written by Kenny O'Dell
Songs written by Larry Henley
Song recordings produced by Snuff Garrett
MCA Records singles